The 24th International Emmy Awards took place on November 25, 1996 in New York City and hosted by Jamie Luner, Dick Cavett and Kenny Rogers. The award ceremony, presented by the International Academy of Television Arts and Sciences (IATAS), honors all programming produced and originally aired outside the United States.

Winners

Best Arts Documentary 
 The House (United Kingdom: BBC)

Best Children and Young People Program 
 Newsround Extra: War Child (United Kingdom: BBC)

Best Documentary 
 The Pelican of Ramzan the Red (France: Canal +)
 People's Century: for episode 1933: Master Race (United Kingdom: BBC)
 The Saga of Life: The Unknown World (Sweden: WGBH/ZDF/Arte/Channel 4)

Best Drama Series 
 La Colline aux Mille Enfants (France: France Télévisions

Best Popular Arts 
 Wallace & Gromit: A Close Shave (United Kingdom: BBC)

Founders Award 
 Reg Grundy (Grundy Productions)

Directorate Award 
 Herbert A. Granath (ABC)

References

External links 
 
 

International Emmy Awards ceremonies
International
International